Wristlet may refer to:
 Wristlet, a small handbag with a short carrying strap resembling a bracelet 
 Wristwatch, originally known as a wristlet when the vast majority of personal timepieces were pocket watches
 Trench watch, a transitional design between the pocket watch and the wristwatch used by the military during World War I 
 Lady Churchill's Rosebud Wristlet, a twice-yearly zine published by Small Beer Press